The country in which a motor vehicle's vehicle registration plate was issued may be indicated by an international licence plate country code, formerly known as an International Registration Letter or International Circulation Mark. It is referred to as the Distinguishing sign of the State of registration in the Geneva Convention on Road Traffic of 1949 and the Vienna Convention on Road Traffic of 1968.

The allocation of codes is maintained by the United Nations Economic Commission for Europe as the Distinguishing Signs Used on Vehicles in International Traffic (sometimes abbreviated to DSIT), authorised by the UN's Geneva Convention on Road Traffic and the Vienna Convention on Road Traffic. Many vehicle codes created since the adoption of ISO 3166 coincide with ISO two- or three-letter codes. The 2004 South-East Asian Agreement ... for the Facilitation of Cross-Border Transport of Goods and People uses a mixture of ISO and DSIT codes: Myanmar uses MYA, China CHN, and Cambodia KH (ISO codes), Thailand uses T (DSIT code), Laos LAO, and Vietnam VN (coincident ISO and DSIT codes).

The Geneva Convention on Road Traffic entered into force on 26 March 1952. One of the main benefits of the convention for motorists is the obligation on signatory countries to recognize the legality of vehicles from other signatory countries. When driving in other signatory countries, the distinguishing sign of the country of registration must be displayed on the rear of the vehicle. This sign must be placed separately from the registration plate and may not be incorporated into the vehicle registration plate.

History

1909 Paris Convention
The display of a national distinctive mark on a white oval plate, 30 cm × 18cm with black letters was first introduced by the 1909 International Convention with respect to the Circulation of Motor Vehicles signed in Paris. The plate was required to be affixed to the rear of the vehicle, separate from the number plate displaying the vehicle's national registration mark. The 1909 convention only allowed distinctive marks to be of one or two Latin letters.

1924 Paris Convention
The term distinguishing mark was adopted by the 1924 International Convention Relative to Motor Traffic signed in Paris, which extended the maximum length of mark from two to three Latin letters, and permitted not just distinguishing marks for states, but also for non-sovereign territories which operated their own vehicle registration systems.

Location
Since the Vienna Convention on Road Traffic entered into force on 21 May 1977, in signatory countries it replaces previous road traffic conventions, including the Geneva Convention on Road Traffic, in accordance with its Article 48. According to the Vienna Convention on Road Traffic, the distinguishing sign of the country of registration must be displayed on the rear of the vehicle. The sign may either be placed separately from the registration plate as a white oval plate or sticker, or be incorporated in the vehicle registration plate. When the distinguishing sign is incorporated in the registration plate, it must also appear on the front registration plate of the vehicle.

The requirement to display a separate distinguishing sign is not necessary within the European Economic Area, for vehicles with license plates in the common EU format, which satisfy the requirements of the Vienna Convention, and so are also valid in non-EU countries signatory to that convention. Separate signs are also not needed for Canada, Mexico and the United States, where the province, state or district of registration is usually embossed or surface-printed on the vehicle registration plate.

Current codes

Codes no longer in use

Unofficial codes

There are unofficial codes in common use, such as "AS" for Asturias, "CAT" for Catalonia, "SCO" for Scotland, "CYM" for Wales (Welsh Cymru), "BZH" for Brittany (Breizh), "VL" for Flanders (Vlaams), "V" for Vojvodina/Vajdaság, "TS" for Transylvania, "P" for Palestine, "PR" for Puerto Rico, "CSB" for Kashubia (Cassubia) and "SIC" for Székely Land (from Latin Terra Siculorum). Some of these, such as "VL" which is used by Flemish separatists, are used despite being specifically illegal under local laws.

In addition, in some areas, vehicle-style stickers have been used to denote and promote other entities, such as towns, islands, businesses, and even associations. These irregular stickers almost always bear an explanation of the code in small print near the edge of the sticker, as the codes used may be unfamiliar.

Kosovo

Diplomatic licence plate codes
A separate system is used for vehicles belonging to the diplomats of foreign countries with license plate from the host country. That system is host country-specific and varies largely from country to country. For example, TR on a diplomatic car in the USA indicates Italian, not Turkish. Such markings in other countries (e.g. Norway) are indicated with numbers only, again different from international standards (e.g. 90 means Slovakia in Norway).

See also
 Aircraft registration
 International Driving Permit
 ISO 3166
 Vienna Convention on Road Traffic
 Vehicle identification number

References

Further reading 
 "RPW": Neil Parker and John Weeks, Registration Plates of the World, Europlate; 4th edition (2004)

External links

 Distinguishing Signs of Vehicles, UNECE
 Distinguishing Signs used on Vehicles in International Traffic Notified to the Secretary General of the United Nations, UNECE
 Convention on Road Traffic, Geneva, United Nations Treaty Collection
 Convention on Road Traffic, Vienna, United Nations Treaty Collection
 UN Economic Commission for Europe, Working Party on Road Transport (WP.11)
 Miscellaneous Proposals of Amendments to the Model Regulations on the Transport of Dangerous Goods: Identification of Approval Country in Marking, UN/SCETDG/33/INF.5 (table compares ISO 3166 and DSIT codes)
 Association Francoplaque: Collectionneurs de Plaques d'Immatriculation (data mostly from RPW, above)
 European Registration Plate Association: Registration Plates of the World Online (registration required; data mostly from RPW, above)

International license plate codes
International license plate codes
Vehicle registration plates